The 2014–15 Melbourne Victory FC season was the club's 10th season since its establishment in 2004. The club participated in the A-League for the 10th time, winning the double for the third time, and competed in the FFA Cup for the first time.

Players

Squad information

From the youth system

Transfers in

Transfers out

Technical staff

Statistics

Squad statistics

|-
|colspan="19"|Players no longer at the club:

Pre-season and friendlies

Competitions

Overall

A-League

League table

Results summary

Results by round

Matches

Finals series

FFA Cup

Awards
 A-League Premiers
 A-League Champions
 Mark Milligan – Joe Marston Medal

References

External links
 Official Website

Melbourne Victory
Melbourne Victory FC seasons